Macrosaccus coursetiae is a moth of the family Gracillariidae. It is known from Arizona in the United States.

The larvae feed on Coursetia glandulosa. They mine the leaves of their host plant. 

Larvae are parasitized by Chrysocharis walleyi, a parasitoid wasp in the family (Eulophidae).

References

Moths of North America
Lepidoptera of the United States
Moths described in 2017
Leaf miners
Taxa named by Donald R. Davis (entomologist)
Taxa named by Charles Eiseman